Aneroid (2016 population 50) is a special service area in the Rural Municipality of Auvergne No. 76 in southwestern Saskatchewan, Canada. The community is located approximately 70 km southeast of Swift Current at the intersection of Highway 13 and Highway 612.

History 
Prior to December 31, 2008, Aneroid was incorporated as a village, and was restructured as a special service area under the jurisdiction of the Rural municipality of Invergordon on that date.

Demographics 

History 
The most popular version of the origin of the name is that the first survey party lost its aneroid barometer on the present townsite. Many of the streets in the village are named after surveyor's instruments.

The post office was established as Val Blair on February 1, 1911, and renamed Aneroid on December 1, 1913. Formerly a village, Aneroid was restructured as a special service area on December 31, 2008, under the administration of R.M. Auvergne No. 76.

Significant remaining historic buildings in the community include the 1915 Public School and the 1926 United Church. The two-storey, brick Public School was designed by Stanley Edgar Storey, one of the most significant architects in Saskatchewan; it operated from 1915 to 1997. The red-brick church was designed by architect Charles Nicholson and built in 1926.

Infrastructure 
Saskatchewan Transportation Company used to provide intercity bus service to Aneroid; however, these operations were ceased in 2017.
Great Western Railway

Notable residents 
Patrick Marleau, forward for the San Jose Sharks and record-holder for NHL all-time games played.

Climate

See also 

 List of communities in Saskatchewan
 List of hamlets in Saskatchewan

References 

Auvergne No. 76, Saskatchewan
Designated places in Saskatchewan
Former villages in Saskatchewan
Special service areas in Saskatchewan
Populated places disestablished in 2008
Division No. 3, Saskatchewan